The following is a list of the major work by Theodor W. Adorno, a 20th-century German philosopher, sociologist and critical theorist associated closely with the Frankfurt School.  This list also includes information regarding English translation.

Collected work
Adorno's Gesammelte Schriften [GS] are published by Suhrkamp Verlag. Edited by Rolf Tiedemann, with Gretel Adorno, Susan Buck-Morss and Klaus Schultz, the twenty volume edition of Adorno's writings were published from 1970 to 1986. Additionally, his Nachgelassene Schriften [NaS], edited by the Theodor W. Adorno Archive, includes his lecture courses, as well as incomplete works.

Writings

Lectures
 Der Jargon der Eigentlichkeit. Hessischer Rundfunk, Abendstudio, April 9, 1963.
Aspekte des neuen Rechtsradikalismus, Lecture to the Socialist Students of Austria, University of Vienna, April 6, 1967.  
 Kritik am Positismus. Zum Grundsatzstreit in der deutschen Soziologie. Hessischer Rundfunk, Abendstudio, February 11, 1969.

Posthumously published writings

Correspondence

References

Bibliographies by writer
Bibliographies of German writers
Continental philosophy
Critical theory
Frankfurt School
Philosophy bibliographies
Contemporary philosophical literature
Works by Theodor W. Adorno